Yves Michaud (born February 13, 1930 in Saint-Hyacinthe, Quebec, Canada) is a prominent Quebec public figure, a sovereigntist and pur et dur supporter of the Parti Québécois.

Background

In 1959, Michaud received a Canada Council grant to study journalism in France at the Université de Strasbourg. He then began a career as a journalist for the Clairon in Saint-Hyacinthe. He was later chief editor of La Patrie and also had a chronicle for the magazine  7 jours.

Member of the legislature

He joined the ranks of the Liberal Party of Quebec and was elected in the Gouin riding in the 1966 provincial election, which the Liberals lost. He became friends with fellow Liberals René Lévesque and Robert Bourassa, who would both later become Premiers of Quebec.

In 1969, Michaud left the Liberal Party and sat as an Independent to protest against the passage of Bill 63, a controversial language legislation.  He ran for re-election as a Liberal candidate in the 1970 election, but was defeated by 12 votes by Parti Québécois candidate Guy Joron.

Parti Québécois supporter

He joined the Parti Québécois in the subsequent years and ran as was a candidate of this party in the district of Bourassa in 1973 Quebec general election.  He lost against Liberal Lise Bacon.

He then founded Le Jour, the first daily newspaper promoting Quebec independence.
In 1979, he was in charge of the Quebec Government House of Paris.

Michaud has called the English language a scar and disfigurement on the face of Montreal.  He has also described the language situation in Quebec as a cancer that occasionally goes into remission.

Robin Hood of the banks

Often  called Robin des banques (Robin Hood of the banks), Yves Michaud is known by the people of Quebec for his crusade against the practices of large corporations. In 1993, he founded the Association des petits épargnants et investisseurs du Québec (Association of small savers and investors), and won a number of victories in court.

The Michaud Affair

In December 2000 Yves Michaud announced that he would seek the Parti Québécois nomination for a by-election in the district of Mercier.  However, his candidacy was plagued with controversy, after he made sensitive comments about the Jewish community in a radio interview.

One recollection of his comments, amongst other things, was that he stated that the Jewish people had suffered, but that other peoples had also endured great tragedies. ("The Jews weren't the only people to have suffered.") However, as the affair went along, due notably to Michaud's open defence of Quebecker nationalism, he was increasingly portrayed by some as an anti-semite and denier of the Shoah, which he has always categorically said he was not.

It culminated in a motion of censure from the National Assembly of Quebec. Lucien Bouchard is also said to have been influenced by the weight of the affair (which received extremely negative coverage in the international press) to resign as Premier of Quebec in 2001 (although he did not admit it). Michaud still fights to this day for recognition of the motion of censure as an "anti-democratic mistake".

Also, Bouchard announced that he would block Michaud's candidacy.  Claudel Toussaint received the nomination.  Michaud's faction ran its own candidate: Paul Cliche.  Both sovereigntist candidates lost the by-election against Liberal nominee Nathalie Rochefort.

See also
Sovereigntist events and strategies
Quebec sovereigntism

References

External links
 

Quebec Liberal Party MNAs
1930 births
Journalists from Quebec
Living people
Quebec sovereigntists
People from Saint-Hyacinthe